The 1962–63 Boston Bruins season was the Bruins' 39th season in the NHL.

Offseason

Regular season

Final standings

Record vs. opponents

Schedule and results

Playoffs

Player statistics

Regular season
Scoring

Goaltending

Awards and records

Transactions

See also
1962–63 NHL season

References

External links

Boston Bruins seasons
Boston Bruins
Boston Bruins
Boston Bruins
Boston Bruins
1960s in Boston